Intermediate may refer to:

 Intermediate 1 or Intermediate 2, educational qualifications in Scotland
 Intermediate (anatomy), the relative location of an anatomical structure lying between two other structures: see Anatomical terms of location
 Intermediate Edison Screw, a system of light bulb connectors
 Intermediate goods, goods used to produce other goods
 Middle school, also known as intermediate school
 Intermediate Examination, standardized post-secondary exams in the Indian Subcontinent, also known as the Higher Secondary Examination
 In chemistry, a reaction intermediate is a reaction product that serves as a precursor for other reactions
 A reactive intermediate is a highly reactive reaction intermediate, hence usually short-lived
 Intermediate car, an automobile size classification
 Intermediate cartridge, a type of firearms cartridge
 Intermediate composition, a geological classification of the mineral composition of a rock, between mafic and felsic
 Intermediate, Michigan, a historic community

See also
 Intermedia (disambiguation), a word meaning "across multiple channels" in Latin
 Intermediate Certificate (disambiguation)